! (pronounced "Exclamation Mark") is the second studio album by American rapper Trippie Redd. It was released on August 9, 2019, by TenThousand Projects and Caroline Records. The album features appearances from Diplo, The Game, Lil Duke, Lil Baby and Coi Leray. The album also originally featured Playboi Carti, but was later removed from the album.

Background
In January 2019, Trippie Redd announced that he had two more projects to be released soon in an Instagram live stream, his second studio album, Immortal and Mobile Suit Pussy, which was reportedly set to be his fourth commercial mixtape, but it then became scrapped. He explained that Immortal would have tracks where deep and romantic concepts are present, while Mobile Suit Pussy would have contained tracks that are "bangers". Later in March 2019 in another Instagram live stream, Redd stated that his second album had "shifted and changed" and was no longer titled Immortal. He later revealed that the album would be titled !, and inspired by collaborator XXXTentacion's? album.

Trippie released the lead single to the album "Under Enemy Arms" on May 29, 2019. He confirmed in an interview with Zane Lowe of Beats 1 Radio that the album would be titled ! and was already completed, but that he wanted to add several more features as well as videos.

Critical reception

! was met with mixed reviews. At Metacritic, which assigns a normalized rating out of 100 to reviews from professional publications, the album received an average score of 59, which indicates "mixed or average reviews", based on 6 reviews.

Rachel Aroesti of The Guardian described the album as "compelling but contradictory emo-rap", noting lyrical contradictions and concluding it "is doubtless part of the genre's forward march – but it's hard to get past the sense that White has sacrificed a coherent artistic identity in the name of progress." Writing for Pitchfork, Andy O'Connor wrote that the "songs touch on being true to oneself at all costs, but these half-baked lessons land flat since Redd himself doesn't really have an identity, musical or otherwise", further commenting, "Most of what happens here couldn't even realistically be considered rapping", calling the verses "dull and unimaginative on top of being restrictive in form" and "nonsense bars". O'Connor concluded that "the most enjoyable moments feel like controlled chaos. Redd [...] does at least sound more composed. That's to his credit as a person but it's not to his advantage as an artist."

Commercial performance
The album debuted at number three on the US Billboard 200 with 51,000 album-equivalent units, of which 7,000 were pure album sales in its first week.

Track listing
Credits adapted from Apple Music.

Notes
 "They Afraid of You" (featuring Playboi Carti) originally appeared on the album, but was later removed (including physical), and from all streaming platforms.

Charts

Weekly charts

Year-end charts

References

2019 albums
Trippie Redd albums
Albums produced by Wheezy
Albums produced by Bobby Raps
Albums produced by Diplo
Albums produced by Murda Beatz
Albums produced by Frank Dukes
Albums produced by WondaGurl